Hot Country Songs is a chart that ranks the top-performing country music songs in the United States, published by Billboard magazine.  In 1975, 43 different singles topped the chart, at the time published under the title Hot Country Singles, in 52 issues of the magazine.  Chart placings were based on playlists submitted by country music radio stations and sales reports submitted by stores.

Merle Haggard had the most number ones in 1975, taking four different singles to the top spot.  The four singles spent a total of five weeks at number one, tying Haggard with Freddy Fender for the highest number of weeks spent atop the chart by a single artist in 1975.  When Fender reached number one with "Before the Next Teardrop Falls" in the issue of Billboard dated March 15, he achieved the feat of topping the Hot Country chart with his first hit.  The Tex-Mex-influenced song went on to be a crossover success, topping Billboards all-genre singles chart, the Hot 100, in May.  Five other singles released in 1975 reached number one on both charts: "(Hey Won't You Play) Another Somebody Done Somebody Wrong Song" by B.J. Thomas, "Rhinestone Cowboy" by Glen Campbell, both "Thank God I'm a Country Boy" and "I'm Sorry" by John Denver, and "Convoy" by C.W. McCall.  "Rhinestone Cowboy" spent three non-consecutive weeks atop the country listing, the only song to spend more than two weeks in the top spot.

In October, Willie Nelson had his first number one single with "Blue Eyes Crying in the Rain", taken from his breakthrough album Red Headed Stranger.  The song's arrangement was simple and contrasted with the lush country-pop style prevalent at the time which characterized the recordings of crossover artists such as Glen Campbell.  Nelson had been active as a singer and songwriter since the 1960s and several of his songs had been chart-toppers for other artists, but his own recordings had not achieved great success prior to 1975.  "Blue Eyes Crying in the Rain" marked the start of his transformation into a major star of country music who remained a regular chart-topper for a decade and was inducted into the Country Music Hall of Fame in 1993.  Eight other artists topped the Hot Country chart for the first time in 1975. T. G. Sheppard achieved his first number one in February with "Devil in the Bottle", and followed it up later in the year with his second, "Tryin' to Beat the Morning Home".  Billie Jo Spears gained her only number one with "Blanket on the Ground",  as did Gary Stewart with "She's Actin' Single (I'm Drinkin' Doubles)".  Linda Ronstadt and B. J. Thomas each topped the country chart for the first time having already achieved a chart-topper with an earlier single on the Hot 100.  Other acts to achieve a first number one on the Hot Country chart in 1975 were Jessi Colter, Dickey Lee, and C. W. McCall, whose song "Convoy" reached the top of the chart in the issue of Billboard dated December 20, beginning a run which would ultimately last for six weeks.

Chart history

See also
1975 in music
List of artists who reached number one on the U.S. country chart

References

1975
1975 record charts
Country